Archibald William Clark (4 April 1902 – January 1967) was an English football player and manager.

Playing career
Born in Shoreham, Kent, Clark started out at Grays Thurrock before turning professional and joining Brentford in March 1927. He only played one League game for the Bees, before moving to Arsenal in May the same year. Mainly used as a wing half at Arsenal, he was mostly a reserve, only playing one first-team game, in a 4–1 defeat to Blackburn Rovers at Ewood Park on 5 November 1927.

He moved to Luton Town in November 1928 and spent three seasons there before joining Everton in 1931. He was a near ever-present as they won the 1931–32 First Division title. However, he was forced out of the side by Cliff Britton and Joe Mercer and between 1932 and 1936 only played two League games. In 1936 he moved to Tranmere Rovers and won the 1937–38 Third Division North title.

Managerial career
He managed Gillingham for nineteen years, from 1939 to 1958. He also had a brief spell as acting manager of Sheffield United. He finished his career as a scout at Sheffield United. He died aged 62 in January 1967.

References

External links

1902 births
1967 deaths
English footballers
Grays Thurrock United F.C. players
Arsenal F.C. players
Brentford F.C. players
Everton F.C. players
Luton Town F.C. players
Tranmere Rovers F.C. players
English football managers
Gillingham F.C. players
Gillingham F.C. managers
Sheffield United F.C. managers
People from Shoreham, Kent
Association football midfielders